Yodong Muk clan was one of the Korean clans. Their Bon-gwan was in Liaodong Commandery, China. According to the research in 1985, the number of Yodong Muk clan was 274. Muk clan was born in Liang County, China. Yodong Muk clan was one of the descendants of Mozi who was a thinker from Lu in China's Spring and Autumn period.

See also 
 Korean clan names of foreign origin

References

External links 
 

 
Korean clan names of Chinese origin